Applegate Peak is an  summit on the south rim of Crater Lake in Crater Lake National Park, Oregon. It ranks as the fourth-highest peak in the park. Topographic relief is significant as the summit rises 1,950 feet above the lake in 0.37 mile. Rim Drive traverses the eastern base of the peak. Precipitation runoff from the mountain's north slope drains into Crater Lake whereas the south slope drains to Wood River via Sun and Annie creeks.

History
Applegate Peak was named in the 1800s for Captain Oliver Cromwell Applegate (1845–1938), an early pioneer of Klamath Falls. In August 1872, Oliver Applegate, Lord William Maxwell, John Meacham, Chester Sawtelle, and A. Bentley succeeded in placing a boat in Crater Lake and taking the first extended excursion around the lake at which time they named prominent landforms after themselves. The peak's toponym was officially adopted February 4, 1931, by the United States Board on Geographic Names. On August 6, 1948, George M. Roest (age 18) a park concessioner’s employee, fell to his death while climbing alone on Applegate Peak.

Climate

Based on the Köppen climate classification, Applegate Peak has a subalpine climate. Most weather fronts originate in the Pacific Ocean, and travel east toward the Cascades where they are forced upward by the range (Orographic lift), causing them to drop their moisture in the form of rain or snowfall. As a result, the Cascades experience high precipitation, especially during the winter months in the form of snowfall. Winter temperatures can drop below  with wind chill factors below . In the Crater Lake area, winter lasts eight months with an average snowfall of 41 feet (12.5 m) per year. During winter months, weather is usually cloudy, but due to high pressure systems over the Pacific Ocean that intensify during summer months, there is often little or no cloud cover during the summer.

Geology

Applegate Peak was created when Mount Mazama, a large stratovolcano erupted violently approximately 7,700 years ago and formed on the caldera rim. The peak is composed of lava flows containing andesite, dacite, and breccias.

See also
 
 Geology of the Pacific Northwest

Gallery

References

External links
 Crater Lake National Park (National Park Service)
 Weather forecast: Applegate Peak

Cascade Range
Cascade Volcanoes
Volcanoes of Oregon
Volcanoes of Klamath County, Oregon
Crater Lake National Park
Mountains of Klamath County, Oregon
Mountains of Oregon
North American 2000 m summits